The men's Greco-Roman 67 kilograms is a competition featured at the 2018 World Wrestling Championships, and was held in Budapest, Hungary on 26 and 27 October.

Results
Legend
F — Won by fall

Finals

Top half

Section 1

Section 2

Bottom half

Section 3

Section 4

Repechage

References

External links
Official website

Men's Greco-Roman 67 kg